Everton Nascimento de Mendonça (born 3 July 1993), known as just Everton, is a Brazilian professional footballer who plays for Indonesian club PSM Makassar as a forward.

Football career
On 3 July 2017, Everton signed a four-year contract with the Portuguese Primeira Liga club Marítimo.

Everton moved to Bahrain on 22 January 2019, where he signed with Al-Muharraq.

PSM Makassar
He was signed for PSM Makassar to play in Liga 1 in the 2022 season. Everton made his league debut on 23 July 2022 in a match against PSS Sleman at the Maguwoharjo Stadium, Sleman.

References

External links
 

1993 births
Living people
Brazilian footballers
Brazilian expatriate footballers
Salgueiro Atlético Clube players
Agremiação Sportiva Arapiraquense players
Bucheon FC 1995 players
Manama Club players
C.S. Marítimo players
Al-Muharraq SC players
Al-Adalah FC players
Hidd SCC players
PSM Makassar players
Campeonato Brasileiro Série C players
K League 2 players
Primeira Liga players
Saudi First Division League players
Bahraini Premier League players
Liga 1 (Indonesia) players
Expatriate footballers in Portugal
Brazilian expatriate sportspeople in Portugal
Expatriate footballers in Saudi Arabia
Brazilian expatriate sportspeople in Saudi Arabia
Expatriate footballers in Bahrain
Brazilian expatriate sportspeople in Bahrain
Expatriate footballers in South Korea
Brazilian expatriate sportspeople in South Korea
Brazilian expatriate sportspeople in Indonesia
Expatriate footballers in Indonesia
Association football forwards
People from Maceió
Sportspeople from Alagoas